The 2022–23 Sun Belt men's basketball season will be the season for Sun Belt Conference basketball teams that will begin with practices in October 2022, followed by the start of the 2022–23 NCAA Division I men's basketball season in November 2022. The regular season will end in March 2023.

Conference realignment 

The SBC lost two members and gained four in July 2022.

The conference's two non-football members, Little Rock and UT Arlington, left with Little Rock joining the Ohio Valley Conference and UT Arlington joining the Western Athletic Conference. Three schools left Conference USA to join the SBC—Marshall, Old Dominion, and Southern Miss, with Old Dominion returning to the SBC after a 31-year absence. James Madison joined from the Colonial Athletic Association.

Head coaches

Coaching changes

Georgia State 
Following an appearance in the 2022 NCAA Division I tournament, Georgia State head coach Rob Lanier left to coach the SMU Mustangs. On April 6, 2022, Jonas Hayes was named as the new head coach starting the 2022 regular season.

Coaches 

Notes: 

 All records, appearances, titles, etc. are from time with current school only.
 Year at school includes 2022–23 season.
 Overall and Sun Belt records are from time at current school only and are through the beginning of the season.

Preseason

Preseason Coaches Poll
On October 17, 2022, the conference announced a preseason conference poll as voted on by the league's 14 head coaches.

Preseason Awards
The conference also announced preseason All-SBC teams.

Attendance

References